Belovite-(La) is the lanthanum analogue of Belovite-(Ce). It is a member in the belovite group being a subgroup of the apatite group.

Belovite-(La) was first described in 1996, it inherited the name Belovite. 
and named for Nikolai Belov. Two type localities are given in the Khibiny Mountains in Murmansk Oblast, Russia.

References

Sodium minerals
Strontium minerals
Lanthanum minerals
Phosphate minerals
Trigonal minerals
Minerals in space group 147
Minerals described in 1996